Phyllanthus kaweesakii is a species of shrub native to northeastern Thailand described in 2017.

References

kaweesakii
Caudiciform plants
Plants described in 2017